The surname Tajik may refer to:

 Pouya Tajik, Iranian basketball player
 Samantha Tajik, Iranian-Canadian actress, model, and TV personality
 Hadia Tajik
 Abdul Jamil Tajik, Pakistani American physician and medical investigator

See also
Tajik (disambiguation)

Turkic-language surnames